İzmir BB GSK, short for İzmir Büyükşehir Belediyesi Gençlik Spor Kulübü, is the ice hockey team of the same named multi-sport club in İzmir, Turkey founded by the metropolitan municipality in 2000. Currently, the team compete in the Turkish Ice Hockey Super League (TBHSL). The team play their home matches in the Bornova Ice Sports Hall.

Achievements
The team was runner-up in the seasons 2012–13, 2014–15 and 2015–16. They enjoyed league champion title in the 2013–14 season, and played so at the 2014–15 IIHF Continental Cup Group A.

Current roster
As o 2014–15 season.

Coaching staff
As of 2014–15 season.

 General Manager: Mehmet Tataroğulları
 Head coach: Mehmet Tataroğulları

References

Ice hockey
Ice hockey teams in Turkey
Turkish Ice Hockey Super League teams
Ice hockey clubs established in 2000
2000 establishments in Turkey
Sports teams in İzmir